SKA Stadium, a name of several stadiums in Ukraine

 SKA Stadium, a stadium in Lviv
 SKA Stadium, a stadium in Odessa
 SKA Stadium, a former name of CSK ZSU Stadium in Kyiv

Sports venues in Ukraine